Onteora Park Historic District is a national historic district located at Hunter in Greene County, New York. The district contains 94 contributing buildings and seven contributing structures. It is composed of a golf course and extensive hiking trails planned during the late 19th century.  The small residential area was laid out in 1880. The district is characterized by woodlands and open space and features breathtaking panoramic mountainous landscape views.

It was listed on the National Register of Historic Places in 2003.

References

Historic districts on the National Register of Historic Places in New York (state)
Historic districts in Greene County, New York
National Register of Historic Places in Greene County, New York